Rifle Butts Quarry is a Site of Special Scientific Interest (SSSI)  in the East Riding of Yorkshire, England. The particular interest of this reserve is the geological feature exposed on the quarry face. The site is owned by the Yorkshire Wildlife Trust. The exposure which is identified as being of national importance in the Geological Conservation Review shows a Cretaceous unconformity, where sediments from the Jurassic and Lower Cretaceous periods were eroded away. It shows a section of Red Chalk and White Chalk overlying Lias. A shelter has been constructed to protect the quarry face from erosion. The reserve is situated on the western edge of the Yorkshire Wolds, one mile south-east of Goodmanham and two miles from Market Weighton. The site, which was designated a SSSI in 1952, has over 150 plants recorded. It still displays some characteristic chalk species, including cowslip, marjoram, field scabious and wild basil. Breeding birds include willow warbler and yellowhammer.

References

External links
Hull Geological Society page about Rifle Butts Quarry SSSI

Conservation in the United Kingdom
Sites of Special Scientific Interest in the East Riding of Yorkshire
Yorkshire Wolds